Megachile pilosella is a species of bee in the family Megachilidae. It was described by Friese in 1922.

References

pilosella
Insects described in 1922